The Believer Poetry Award is an American literary award presented yearly by The Believer magazine to poetry collections the magazine's editors thought were "the finest, and the most deserving of greater recognition" of the year.  The inaugural award was in 2011 for books published in 2010.

Winners and shortlist
The year below denotes when the books were published; the award is announced the following year. Thus below, the inaugural 2010 books were announced in early to mid-2011.

Winners are listed first, highlighted in boldface, and indicated with a double dagger

2010
The shortlist was announced in March 2011. The winner was announced in May 2011.
Atsuro Riley, Romey's Order
John Beer, The Waste Land and Other Poems
Michael Earl Craig, Thin Kimono
Lisa Robertson, R’s Boat
Matthew Zapruder, Come On All You Ghosts

2011
The shortlist was announced in March 2012. The winner was announced in May 2012.
Heather Christle, The Trees The Trees
Alan Gilbert, Late in the Antenna Fields
Laura Kasischke, Space, in Chains
Jim Moore, Invisible Strings
Kathleen Ossip, The Cold War

2012
The shortlist was announced in March 2013. The winner was announced in May 2013.
Samuel Amadon, The Hartford Book
James Arthur, Charms Against Lightning
Emily Pettit, Goat in the Snow
Gregory Sherl, The Oregon Trail is the Oregon Trail
Sun Yung Shin, Rough, and Savage

2013
The shortlist was announced in March 2014. The winner was announced in May 2014.
 Karen L. Green, Bough Down
Graham Foust, To Anacreon in Heaven and Other Poems
Dobby Gibson, It Becomes You
Mira Gonzalez, I Will Never Be Beautiful Enough to Make Us Beautiful Together
Tess Taylor, The Forage House

2014
The shortlist was announced in April 2015. 
Jericho Brown, The New Testament
CAConrad, ECODEVIANCE: (Soma)tics for the Future Wilderness
Annelyse Gelman, Everyone I Love Is a Stranger to Someone
Judy Halebsky, Tree Line
Benjamin Landry, Particle and Wave

2017
The winner was announced in June 2018.

Aditi Machado, Some Beheadings

2018
The longlist was announced in January 2019. The shortlist and winner was announced in April 2019.

Catherine Barnett, Human Hours 
Monica Ferrell, You Darling Thing
Chelsey Minnis, Baby, I Don't Care
Jamie Mortara, Good Morning America I Am Hungry and on Fire
Ashley Toliver, Spectra

See also
Believer Book Award
Believer Nonfiction Award

References

American poetry awards
Awards established in 2011